Boštjan Lekan (born 20 January 1966) is a Slovenian biathlete. He competed at the 1992 Winter Olympics and the 1994 Winter Olympics.

References

1966 births
Living people
Slovenian male biathletes
Olympic biathletes of Slovenia
Biathletes at the 1992 Winter Olympics
Biathletes at the 1994 Winter Olympics
People from Domžale
20th-century Slovenian people